Amir Cheshme Khosravi "Shabani" (born 4 May 1998) is an Iranian footballer who plays as a midfielder for Pars Jonoubi Jam in the Persian Gulf Pro League.

Club career

Pars Jonoubi Jam
He made his debut for Pars Jonoubi Jam in 15th fixtures of 2018–19 Iran Pro League against Persepolis while he substituted in for Mohsen Bengar.

References

1998 births
Living people
Iranian footballers
Pars Jonoubi Jam players
Persian Gulf Pro League players
People from Sonqor
Association football midfielders